Schwarze may refer to:
 Achim Schwarze (born 1958), German author
 Schwarze Elster, a river in Germany